Metrosideros collina is a species of flowering plant in the family Myrtaceae. It is native to French Polynesia and the Cook Islands.

Taxonomy
The species was first formally described by botanist Johann Reinhold Forster and his son Georg Forster  in 1775. It was given the name Leptospermum collinum.

There are two varieties:
Metrosideros collina var. collina 
Metrosideros collina var. villosa

Cultivars

Cultivars of Metrosideros collina are used as ornamental plants, for planting in tropical and subtropical climate gardens.
Cultivars include:
 'Tahiti', grows to about 1 metre, 
 'Tahitian sunset', a mutated form of 'Tahiti' with variegated leaves

References

collina
Flora of the Marquesas Islands
Flora of the Society Islands
Garden plants of Australasia